Wilson's blind snake (Myriopholis wilsoni) is a species of snake in the family Leptotyphlopidae. The species is native to Yemen.

Etymology
The specific name, wilsoni, is in honor of American mammalogist Don Ellis Wilson.

Geographic range
M. wilsoni is endemic to the island of Socotra in Yemen.

Habitat

Reproduction
M. wilsoni is oviparous.

References

Further reading
Adalsteinsson SA, Branch WR, Trape S, Vitt LJ, Hedges SB (2009). "Molecular phylogeny, classification, and biogeography of snakes of the family Leptotyphlopidae (Reptilia, Squamata)". Zootaxa 2244: 1-50. (Myriopholis wilsoni, new combination).
Hahn DE (1978). "A Brief Review of the Genus Leptotyphlops (Reptilia, Serpentes, Leptotyphlopidae) of Asia, with Description of a New Species". J. Herpetology 12 (4): 477–489. (Leptotyphlops wilsoni, new species).
Sindaco R, Jeremčenko VK, Venchi A, Grieco C (2013). The Reptiles of the Western Paleartic, Volume 2: Annotated Checklist and Distributional Atlas of the Snakes of Europe, North Africa, Middle East and Central Asia, with an Update to Volume 1. (Monographs of the Societas Herpetologica Italica). Latina, Italy: Edizioni Belvedere. 543 pp. .

Myriopholis
Reptiles described in 1978
Endemic fauna of Socotra
Taxobox binomials not recognized by IUCN